"See You Again" is a song by American rapper and singer Wiz Khalifa featuring fellow American singer Charlie Puth. It was commissioned for the soundtrack of the 2015 film Furious 7 as a tribute to actor Paul Walker, who died in a single-vehicle crash on November 30, 2013. The song was released on March 10, 2015, as the soundtrack's lead single in the United States. It was later included as a bonus track on the international release of Puth's debut album, Nine Track Mind.

"See You Again" became both Khalifa's and Puth's biggest single to date. It spent 12 non-consecutive weeks atop the US Billboard Hot 100, tying Eminem's "Lose Yourself" for the second longest-running rap number-one single in the country behind Lil Nas X's "Old Town Road", and topped the UK Singles Chart for two consecutive weeks. It also reached number one in several other countries including Australia, Austria, Canada, Germany, Ireland, New Zealand and Switzerland. The song held the record for the most-streamed track in a single day on Spotify in the United States, until it was surpassed by One Direction's "Drag Me Down". It set the record for most streams in a single week worldwide, and in the United Kingdom also in a single week.

The music video was the most viewed video on YouTube from July 10 to August 4, 2017. "See You Again" received three nominations at the 58th Annual Grammy Awards: Song of the Year, Best Pop Duo/Group Performance and Best Song Written for Visual Media. It was also shortlisted for the Song of the Year for the BBC Music Awards and was nominated for Best Original Song at the 73rd Golden Globe Awards. "See You Again" was the best selling-song of 2015 worldwide, with combined sales and track-equivalent streams of 20.9 million units according to IFPI.

Writing and development
"See You Again" was written by DJ Frank E, Charlie Puth, Wiz Khalifa, and Andrew Cedar. It was produced by DJ Frank E, Charlie Puth, and Andrew Cedar, with mixing provided by Manny Marroquin. Frank E and Puth were approached by their publishing company, Artist Publishing Group, to develop a melody that could pay tribute to actor Paul Walker for the film Furious 7 (2015). His publishing company's president Ben Maddahi then set up a first-time studio session for Puth with DJ Frank E at a studio in Los Angeles.

Puth became emotionally attached while writing the track, recalling Vail Cerullo, a friend of Puth's from his time at Berklee College of Music, who died in a motorcycle accident in 2012. He was at first reluctant that the film's soundtrack label, Atlantic Records, would choose his vocal for the song. In an interview with the Los Angeles Times, Puth recalled, "It just seemed to occur from out of nowhere. And basically 10 minutes later Justin (Franks [DJ Frank E]) and I wrote it, we sent it off, and I thought we'd never hear about it again". Puth and DJ Frank E's output from the session was well received by Furious 7 filmmakers, Universal Pictures, and Atlantic. As a result, the track was further commissioned to include rapped verses by Khalifa based on the subject of family, combined with Puth's vocals and a piano melody. The song then went through an extensive note-giving and production process. Puth opined that his vocal was chosen by Atlantic because of his emotional attachment to the subject matter. Puth revealed on The Talk that Universal originally wanted to get a more established singer to sing his part. He also revealed in one of his interviews that the song's hook was originally written for Sam Smith.

The song was chosen to be played at the end of the film, whereupon Brian O'Conner's retirement send-off to be with his wife and family, his character and Dominic Toretto drove on a mountain road and parted ways upon reaching a fork.

Composition
"See You Again" is a hip hop and pop-rap ballad.

Commercial performance

North America
In the United States, "See You Again" debuted on the Billboard Hot 100 and Hot R&B/Hip-Hop Songs charts dated March 19, 2015, at number 100 and number 29 respectively, with first-week sales of 25,000 copies. On the chart issued for April 18, 2015, the song climbed from number 84 to number ten on the Billboard Hot 100, selling 168,000 copies as the chart's "Digital Gainer" that week. Its climb into the top ten was the chart's biggest since Katy Perry's "Roar" (2013). In its fifth week, "See You Again" sold 464,000 copies and rose from number ten to number one on the Billboard Hot 100. The song marked Khalifa's second number one on the chart, following "Black and Yellow" (2011), and Puth's first. It topped the Billboard Hot 100 chart for 12 non-consecutive weeks. After its 12th week it was finally knocked off the top spot by Omis hit, "Cheerleader". It is one of 33 songs to reach number one for at least 10 weeks on the Billboard Hot 100. The song also topped the Mainstream Top 40 and Rhythmic charts for four weeks and three weeks respectively. The song also topped Hot Rap Songs and Hot R&B Hip Hip songs for 14 weeks each. As of July 7, 2016, "See You Again" has sold a total of 4,122,938 copies in the United States. The song fell out of the top ten on the chart dated August 29, 2015, spending a total of 19 weeks in the top ten.

The song holds the record for the most-streamed track in a single day on Spotify in the United States. It set the record for most streams in a single week worldwide during April 6 to April 12 (streamed 21.9 million times), and in the United Kingdom in a single week (streamed 3.72 million times from April 20 to April 26, 2015), which was broken by Justin Biebers "What Do You Mean?" (streamed 3.87 million times from September 17 to September 23, 2015).

Europe and Oceania
"See You Again" debuted at number 20 on the UK Singles Chart issued for April 12, 2015, on streaming alone. It registered 1.8 million streams in the United Kingdom that week. Following its digital release, the song climbed to number one on the chart dated April 19, 2015. It sold 193,000 units that week, becoming the fastest-selling single in the United Kingdom of 2015. The song also broke the streaming record in the United Kingdom that week with a total of 3.68 million streams that week. It marked Khalifa's second number one on the chart—following his feature on Maroon 5's "Payphone" (2012)—and Puth's first. "See You Again" sold 142,000 units during its first week at number one, and broke its own streaming record with 3.72 million streams that week. Omi's "Cheerleader" replaced "See You Again" at number one the following week, selling approximately 1,000 units more than "See You Again" at number two.

In New Zealand, "See You Again" debuted at number 34 on the New Zealand Singles Chart dated March 30, 2015. It topped the chart in its third week, becoming Khalifa and Puth's first number one single in the country. In Australia, "See You Again" rose from number 59 to number one on the Australian Singles Chart issued for April 11, 2015, marking Khalifa and Puth's first number one hit on the chart. The song's climb to number one was the largest in Australian Singles Chart history.

Music video
The music video for "See You Again" was directed by Marc Klasfeld. It was uploaded to YouTube on April 6, 2015.

Background
The "See You Again" music video was the most viewed video on YouTube from July 10 to August 4, 2017, and the most liked video on the site from August 27, 2016, to July 25, 2017. As of March 11, 2023, it has received over 5.8 billion views and over 40.4 million likes, making it the site's sixth most viewed and second most liked video. It was the second video ever to record two billion and three billion views, the third video ever to reach four billion views and the fourth video ever to reach five billion views.

Synopsis
The video begins with a shot of a cliff top at sunset, followed by Khalifa walking down a highway road. Puth is then shown singing the chorus whilst sitting at, and playing, a piano located between two cars. Khalifa's rap verses and Puth singing the second chorus and bridge are interspersed with footage from Furious 7. After the bridge, the final movie scene shows Dominic Toretto (Vin Diesel) and Brian O'Conner (Cody Walker, filling in for his brother, Paul) driving together, pulled over in their cars and smiling at each other one last time before driving away on separate roads into the sunset. After the camera pans up into the sky, the screen turns white, the words "For Paul" appear on screen and the video ends.

Reception
The video was the most viewed video on YouTube from July 10, 2017, when it surpassed "Gangnam Style" by Psy, to August 4 of that year, when it was surpassed by "Despacito" by Luis Fonsi featuring Daddy Yankee.

The video was nominated for Best Hip-Hop Video and Best Collaboration at the 2015 MTV Video Music Awards, but lost both. On August 27, 2016, the music video surpassed "Gangnam Style" as YouTube's most liked video of all time, after "Gangnam Style" held the record for almost 4 years. Also, on February 19, 2017, the music video succeeded "Gangnam Style" as the most rated YouTube video of all time with over 13.8 million total ratings. It has since been surpassed by "Despacito" as the most viewed, liked and rated video on YouTube.

Live performances
Khalifa and Puth performed "See You Again" live on The Tonight Show Starring Jimmy Fallon in March 2015 and on an episode of Saturday Night Live in May 2015. Diesel also performed the song live as a tribute to Paul Walker during the 2015 MTV Movie Awards. Khalifa and Puth reprised the song in a performance on The Ellen DeGeneres Show in April 2015. Khalifa has performed the song, without Puth, as part of the Boys of Zummer Tour, in which Khalifa co-headlined with Fall Out Boy. Puth performed the song at the Capital Jingle Bell Ball in 2015. Khalifa also performed the song on season 8 of The Voice, with season 7 finalist Chris Jamison performing Puth's vocals. Wiz Khalifa also performed the song at the 2016 Mnet Asian Music Awards. The intentions were for the song to be performed as a collaboration between Wiz Khalifa and Taeyeon, the leader of K-pop girl group Girls' Generation, but the performance was later cancelled for unknown reasons. Khalifa and Puth also performed the song at the 2016 Kids' Choice Awards.

On January 31, 2020, Khalifa and Puth performed "See You Again" live during halftime of a Portland Trail Blazers-Los Angeles Lakers game at the Staples Center in Los Angeles, as a tribute to Kobe Bryant, his daughter Gianna and seven other victims of the Calabasas helicopter crash.

Awards and nominations

Track listing

Credits and personnel
 
Andrew Cedar – songwriter, producer
DJ Frank E (Justin Franks) – songwriter, producer
Charlie Puth – songwriter, vocals, producer
Brian Tyler – string arranger, conductor
Wiz Khalifa (Cameron Thomaz) – songwriter, vocals
Annie & Chloe – edited version, vocals, producers
Credits adapted from Soundtrack.Net and AllMusic

Charts

Weekly charts

Year-end charts

Decade-end charts

All-time charts

Certifications

Release history

See also

List of best-selling singles
List of Airplay 100 number ones of the 2010s
List of Billboard Hot 100 number-one singles of 2015
List of number-one digital songs of 2015 (U.S.)
List of number-one R&B/hip-hop songs of 2015 (U.S.)
List of Billboard Mainstream Top 40 number-one songs of 2015
List of Billboard Rhythmic number-one songs of the 2010s
List of Hot 100 Airplay number-one singles of the 2010s 
List of number-one singles of 2015 (Australia)
List of number-one digital tracks of 2015 (Australia)
List of number-one streaming tracks of 2015 (Australia)
List of number-one urban singles of 2015 (Australia)
List of number-one hits of 2015 (Austria)
List of Ultratop 50 Flanders number-one singles of 2015
List of Canadian Hot 100 number-one singles of 2015
List of number-one digital songs of 2015 (Canada)
List of number-one hits of 2015 (Denmark)
List of number-one singles of 2015 (Finland)
List of number-one hits of 2015 (Germany)
List of number-one singles of 2015 (Ireland)
List of number-one hits of 2015 (Italy)
List of Mexico Airplay number-one singles from the 2010s
List of Mexico Ingles Airplay singles of the 2010s
List of number-one singles from the 2010s (New Zealand)
List of number-one songs in Norway
List of Romandie Charts number-one singles of 2015
Lists of Scottish number-one singles of 2015
List of number-one singles of 2015 (South Africa)
List of number-one singles of the 2010s (Sweden)
List of number-one hits of 2015 (Switzerland)
List of UK Singles Chart number ones of the 2010s
List of UK R&B Singles Chart number ones of 2015
List of most-liked YouTube videos
List of most-viewed YouTube videos
List of most-streamed songs on Spotify
List of most-streamed songs in the United Kingdom

References

External links

2010s ballads
2015 singles
2015 songs
Wiz Khalifa songs
Charlie Puth songs
Songs written by DJ Frank E
Songs written for films
Billboard Hot 100 number-one singles
Canadian Hot 100 number-one singles
Number-one singles in Australia
Number-one singles in Austria
Number-one singles in Denmark
Number-one singles in Germany
Number-one singles in Greece
Number-one singles in Hungary
Number-one singles in Israel
Number-one singles in Italy
Number-one singles in New Zealand
Number-one singles in Norway
Number-one singles in Romania
Number-one singles in Scotland
Number-one singles in Sweden
Number-one singles in Switzerland
Irish Singles Chart number-one singles
UK Singles Chart number-one singles
Music videos directed by Marc Klasfeld
South African Airplay Chart number-one singles
Fast & Furious music
Songs written by Charlie Puth
Songs written by Wiz Khalifa
Songs written by Dann Hume
Pop ballads
Songs about death
Atlantic Records singles
Song recordings produced by DJ Frank E
Song recordings produced by Charlie Puth